Rothsay is a historic estate located near Forest, Bedford County, Virginia. It was built in 1914, and is a two-story, five bay, brick and frame dwelling in a Georgian Revival / American Craftsman style. The house measures approximately 55 feet by 37 feet. It has a slate covered hipped roof and one-story front and side porches.  Two two-story rear wings were added in 1918. Also on the property are a contributing dovecote / garden seat (1918), pump house (1914), smokehouse (1915), brooder house (1920), and four gate posts (1934) designed by Stanhope Johnson.

It was listed on the National Register of Historic Places in 1992.

References

Houses on the National Register of Historic Places in Virginia
Georgian Revival architecture in Virginia
Houses completed in 1914
Houses in Bedford County, Virginia
National Register of Historic Places in Bedford County, Virginia
U.S. Route 221
1914 establishments in Virginia